Shay Colley (born January 6, 1996 in Halifax, Nova Scotia) is a Canadian basketball player who previously played for the Michigan State Spartans and has played in the Canada women's national basketball team. She has played 32 games at the national level over four years. Colley was an alternate for team Canada at the 2015 Pan American Games in Toronto and is a member of Canada’s 2021 Olympic team.

Colley went to Brampton, Ontario's St. Edmund Campion Secondary School, and graduated from Michigan State University after transferring from the University of South Carolina.

South Carolina and Michigan State statistics 

Source

References

External links

Michigan State Spartans bio

1996 births
Living people
Basketball people from Nova Scotia
Basketball players at the 2018 Commonwealth Games
Basketball players at the 2020 Summer Olympics
Black Canadian basketball players
Canadian expatriate basketball people in the United States
Canadian women's basketball players
Guards (basketball)
Michigan State Spartans women's basketball players
Olympic basketball players of Canada
South Carolina Gamecocks women's basketball players
Sportspeople from Halifax, Nova Scotia
Commonwealth Games competitors for Canada